Elections to Liverpool City Council were held on 2 November 1925.

One third of the council seats were up for election. The term of office for each councillor being three years.

Eight of the thirty-seven seats up for election were uncontested.

After the election, the composition of the council was:

Election result

Ward results

* - Councillor seeking re-election

Comparisons are made with the 1922 election results.

Abercromby

Aigburth

Allerton

Anfield

Breckfield

Brunswick

Castle Street

Dingle

Edge Hill

Everton

Exchange

Fairfield

Fazakerley

Garston

Granby

Great George

Kensington

Kirkdale

Little Woolton

Low Hill

Netherfield

North Scotland

Old Swan

Prince's Park

Sandhills

St. Anne's

St. Domingo

St. Peter's

Sefton Park East

Sefton Park West

South Scotland

Vauxhall

Walton

Warbreck

Wavertree

Wavertree West

West Derby

Aldermanic Elections

Aldermanic Election 9 November 1925

The term of office of Alderman William Albert Robinson
(Labour, last elected as an alderman on 10 November 1919) expired on this date.

At the Council meeting on 9 November 1925 there were two candidates nominated to fill this position: William Albert Robinson and Councillor Patrick Jeremiah Kelly (Catholic, South Scotland, elected as an Irish Nationalist on 1 November 1924).
The result of a poll of Councillors was :

Aldermanic Election 3 February 1926

Caused by the death on 14 December 1925 of Alderman Arthur Crosthwaite (Conservative, last elected as an alderman on 9 November 1920).

In a poll of councillors on 3 February 1926, Councillor James Conrad Cross (Conservative, last elected as a councillor on 1 November 1924) was elected in his place.

By-elections

No. 30 Breckfield, 1 December 1925

Caused by the death on 20 October 1925 of Councillor Alfred Griffiths (Conservative, Breckfield, elected 1 November 1923).

No. 25 Walton, Tuesday 16 February 1926

Following the death of Alderman Arthur Crosthwaite on 14 December 1925, Councillor James Conrad Cross (Conservative, last elected as a councillor on 1 November 1924) was elected as an alderman by the councillors on 3 February 1926.

No. 26 Warbreck, 18 February 1926

Caused by the death on 31 January 1926 of Councillor John Albert Thompson (Conservative, elected 1 November 1923)

No. 18 Edge Hill, Tuesday 20 April 1926

Caused by the death on 18 March 1926 of Councillor Daniel Charles Williams (Conservative, Edge Hill, elected 1 November 1923)

No. 28 West Derby, 

Caused by the death on 21 July 1926 of Councillor Frederick William Riley (Conservative, West Derby, elected 1 November 1923)

See also

 Liverpool City Council
 Liverpool Town Council elections 1835 - 1879
 Liverpool City Council elections 1880–present
 Mayors and Lord Mayors of Liverpool 1207 to present
 History of local government in England

References

1925
1925 English local elections
1920s in Liverpool